Power Query is an ETL tool created by Microsoft for data extraction, loading and transformation, and is used to retrieve data from sources, process it, and load them into one or more target systems. Power Query is available in several variations within the Microsoft Power Platform, and is used for business intelligence on fully or partially self-service platforms. It is found in software such as Excel, Power BI, Analysis Services, Dataverse, Power Apps, Azure Data Factory, SSIS, Dynamics 365, and in cloud services such as Microsoft Dataflows, including Power BI Dataflow used with the online Power BI Service or the somehwat more generic version of Microsoft Dataflow used with Power Automate.

ETL is closely related to data modeling, and for transformation, Power Query can be used to develop a logical data model in those cases where the data does not already have one, or where there is a need to further develop the data model.

History 
Power Query was included as an additional feature in Power Pivot (used for making pivot tables, and more) in Excel 2010 and 2013. In Excel 2016, the function was renamed Get & Transform for a short time, but has since been named Power Query again.

M Formula language 
Power Query is built on what was then a new query language language called M. It is a mashup language (hence the letter M) designed to create queries that mix together data. It is similar to the F Sharp programming language, and according to Microsoft it is a "mostly pure, higher-order, dynamically typed, partially lazy, functional language." The M language is case-sensitive.

Much of the user interaction with Power Query can be done via graphical user interfaces with wizards, and this can be used for many common or basic tasks. It is also possible to use the advanced editing mode where the developer can write in the M formula language; this gives greater expressive power, more possibilities, and can also be used to change the code generated by the graphical wizards.

Let function 
A Power Query written in M consists of a let expression where data and expressions can be referenced between each other, and an in expression which contains the output. Lines in the let expression (which are also called steps) are separated by a comma at the end of each line, except for the last line. Comments are written in C-style, with inline comments beginning with a forward slash (/) symbol, while block comments which can span multiple lines are delimited by /* and */. The M language is powerful and is sometimes necessary for performing certain forms of queries, but for many common tasks, however, users can also often interact with Power Query through the graphical user interfaces without directly working with the M language.

DirectQuery 
In Power BI, use of M-code is somewhat limited in DirectQuery, as opposed to Import which has all capabilities. This is due to the requirement that M-code in DirectQuery has to be translated into SQL at runtime.

Query Folding 
Query Folding is the ability for a Power Query to be transformed into a single query at the data source (for example in Transact SQL). As such, Query Folding works like a traditional ETL process, and enables working on the data before loading. Query Folding is not always supported. Folding indicators (such as folding, not folding, might fold, opaque, unknown) might indicate up to which step a query might fold. Non-folding queries will have to be performed on the client-side. The order of queries can determine how many of the steps which get folded.

See also 
 Online analytical processing (OLAP)
 Data Analysis Expressions (DAX), a complementary expression language used to query models and compute advanced measures
 Logical data model, hereunder star schema with fact table and dimension tables
 Data blending

References 

Microsoft Office